Korevaar is a Dutch surname that may refer to
Jacob Korevaar (born 1923), Dutch mathematician
Jan Jaap Korevaar (born 1957), Dutch water polo player 
Jeanne Korevaar (born 1996), Dutch racing cyclist
Merijn Korevaar (born 1994), Dutch cyclist, brother of Jeanne 
Nijs Korevaar (born 1927), Dutch water polo player, father of Jan Jaap and brother of Jacob

Dutch-language surnames